Robert Freeman Corkum (born December 18, 1967) is an American professional ice hockey coach and former ice hockey center. He was drafted in the third round, 47th overall, by the Buffalo Sabres in the 1986 NHL Entry Draft.

Playing career
Corkum represented the United States at the 1987 World Junior Ice Hockey Championships. After playing four seasons for the University of Maine, Corkum debuted with Buffalo's American Hockey League affiliate, the Rochester Americans, in the 1989–90 season. He also appeared in eight regular season games and five playoff games with the Sabres during the 1989–90 season. After playing for the Americans and Sabres for the next three seasons, Corkum was chosen by the Mighty Ducks of Anaheim in the 1993 NHL Expansion Draft.

After the Mighty Ducks, Corkum made stops with the Philadelphia Flyers, Phoenix Coyotes, Los Angeles Kings, New Jersey Devils, and Atlanta Thrashers. The Thrashers traded him back to the Sabres at the trade deadline of the 2001–02 season. After finishing the season with the Sabres, Corkum retired. 
In his NHL career, Corkum played in 720 games. He recorded 97 goals and 103 assists, for 200 total points. His best season came in 1993–94 with Anaheim, when he scored 23 goals and added 28 assists.

Coaching career
On August 22, 2008, it was announced that Corkum would be returning to his alma mater to become the associate head coach at the University of Maine. He spent the majority of the previous four seasons coaching junior hockey in the EJHL, and prior to that at Newburyport High in Massachusetts.

On April 30, 2013, USA Hockey named Corkum the head coach of Team USA for the 2013 Ivan Hlinka Memorial Tournament to be held in Slovakia during August 2013.

Career statistics

Regular season and playoffs

International

References

External links

1967 births
Living people
American men's ice hockey centers
Atlanta Thrashers players
Buffalo Sabres draft picks
Buffalo Sabres players
Ice hockey coaches from Massachusetts
Los Angeles Kings players
Maine Black Bears men's ice hockey players
Mighty Ducks of Anaheim players
New Jersey Devils players
New York Islanders coaches
People from Salisbury, Massachusetts
Philadelphia Flyers players
Phoenix Coyotes players
Rochester Americans players
Sportspeople from Essex County, Massachusetts
Ice hockey players from Massachusetts